Eupithecia crenata is a moth in the family Geometridae. It is found in Armenia.

References

Moths described in 1975
crenata
Moths of Asia